Bidar Kadın (5 May 1855 – 13 January 1918; meaning "Attentive, enlightened" in Persian) was the fourth consort of Sultan Abdul Hamid II of the Ottoman Empire.

Early life
Of Kabardian Circassian origin, Bidar Kadın was born on 5 May 1855 in Kobuleti. She was daughter of the prince Ibrahim Talustan Bey and his wife, Georgian princess Şahika İffet Lortkipanidze and had two brothers named Çerkeş Hüseyin Paşa and Çerkes Mehmed Ziya Pasha, who worked at the Sultan Palace. Her mother belonged to the Georgian noble family, Lortkipanidze. She was also related to Prince Hüseyin Bey Inalipa by maternal side.

Marriage
Bidar married the then-Prince Abdul Hamid on 2 September 1875. He was fascinated by her beauty and her bold personality. In late 1875, or early 1876, she became pregnant with the couple's first child. After Abdul Hamid's accession to the throne following the deposition of his elder brother Sultan Murad V, on 31 August 1876, she was given the title of "Fourth Kadın".

Bidar who was pregnant at that time, gave birth to her first child, a daughter, five days later on 4 September 1876. The child was named Fatma Naime Sultan, whom Abdul Hamid called "my Accession daughter." In 1877, Bidar and other members of the imperial family settled in the Yıldız Palace, after Abdul Hamid moved there on 7 April 1877. Here she gave birth to her second child, a son, named Şehzade Mehmed Abdülkadir, on 16 January 1878. In 1879, she was elevated to "Third Kadın". 

Bidar was described as the most beautiful and fascinating of Abdülhamid II's consorts. She was tall and slender, with long brown hair and intense green eyes. Her beauty was famous also in Europe.

On 30 September 1889, she met with the German Empress Augusta Victoria in the harem of the Yıldız Palace, when the latter visited Istanbul with her husband Emperor Wilhelm II. On this occasion the countess Mathilde von Keller, lady-in-waiting to the empress, described her as "...the sultana had a beautiful face but looked extremely miserable to this day. I can't forget her expression"
 In 1895, she was elevated to "Second Kadın". In October 1898, she again met Empress Augusta Victoria in the grand salon of the Imperial Lodge of the Yıldız Palace, when the latter visited Istanbul for a second time with her husband. On that occasion the empress herself asked to see Bidar and noticed the beauty of Bidar and her white dress, and Bidar's fame in Europe grew. 

On 27 April 1909, Abdul Hamid was deposed, and sent into exile in Thessaloniki. Her followed him with her brother Mehmed Ziya Pasha. After Thessaloniki fell to Greece in 1912, Abdul Hamid returned to Istanbul, and settled in the Beylerbeyi Palace, where he died in 1918. She settled in a mansion in Fenerbahçe and later in Erenköy Palace.

Death
Bidar Kadın died on 13 January 1918 at the age of sixty-three, in Erenköy Palace, of a disease related to intestinal inflammation, ten months after the death of Sultan Abdul Hamid. She was buried in the mausoleum of Şehzade Ahmed Kemaleddin, Yahya Efendi Cemetery, Istanbul. A few months later the Empress Zita of Bourbon-Parma, visiting Istanbul, asked Sultan Mehmed V to be able to see the famous Bidar, but unfortunately she was already dead.

Issue

In popular culture
 In the 2017 TV series Payitaht: Abdülhamid, Bidar Kadın is portrayed by Turkish actress Özlem Conker.

See also
 Kadın (title)
 Ottoman Imperial Harem
 List of consorts of the Ottoman sultans

References

Sources
 
 
 
 
 

19th-century consorts of Ottoman sultans
1855 births
1918 deaths
People from the Ottoman Empire of Circassian descent
Georgians from the Ottoman Empire
Abdul Hamid II